The Gulfstream G100, formerly known as the IAI Astra SPX, is an Israel Aerospace Industries-manufactured twin-engine business jet, that was produced for Gulfstream Aerospace. Deliveries began in 1986. The United States Navy employs the aircraft as the C-38A Courier. A later derivative known as the G150 was launched in 2002. Gulfstream announced the final sale of the G150 in September 2016 and the last delivery by mid-2017.

Design and development

Israel Aerospace Industries (IAI) developed the Astra from its Model 1124 Westwind business jet. Work on an improved Westwind began in the late 1970s, with the first prototype flight on 19 March 1984. The first production Astra flew on 20 March 1985, with FAA certification granted on 29 August 1985 and customer deliveries starting in 1986.

The original 1125 Astra was replaced by the Astra SP, announced in 1989; 37 were built. The third variant, the Astra SPX, flew for the first time in August 1994. This variant was renamed G100 from September 2002 following Gulfstream's acquisition of Galaxy Aerospace, which held the Astra type certificate, in May 2001.

In September 2002, Gulfstream announced the improved G150, based on the G100. It was certified by the FAA in late 2005. It has been certified for the steeper-than-normal approach path required to land at London City Airport. Production of the G100 was discontinued following certification of the G150. IAI continued to manufacture G150s in Israel and the completed airframes were then flown to the U.S. for interior outfitting. In September 2016, Gulfstream announced that, owing to slow sales, production would be stopped, with delivery of the final aircraft due in mid-2017.

The Astra was further developed in the 1990s; the wing was modified and mated to a completely new fuselage. This development became the IAI Galaxy (later the Gulfstream G200).

By 2018, Gulfstream G150s from 2006–2008 were in the range of $3.8 to $4.8 million.

Operational history

The G100 was ordered for the United States Air Force in 1997 as the C-38A Courier. The C-38A was operated by the 201st Airlift Squadron at Andrews Air Force Base in Maryland until 2015. The C-38A replaced the earlier Learjet C-21. The C-38A differs from the standard Gulfstream G100, being fitted with various military avionics systems.

The C-38A was also ordered for the United States Navy, replacing North American T-2 Buckeyes at Naval Air Station Patuxent River beginning in September 2015. Two aircraft remain in service as of 2023, both former 201st Airlift Squadron C-38's. The C-38 is tasked with acting as a chase plane, radar test target, and pilot proficiency aircraft for the test and evaluation squadron VX-20.

In 2012, an IAI Astra operated by the Eritrean Air Force as the Eritrean presidential aircraft was stolen by two pilots, both serving Eritrean Air Force officers. They flew the Astra to Saudi Arabia and requested political asylum after landing at Jizan Regional Airport.

Variants

IAI 1125 Astra Original version, powered by two  Garrett TFE731-3A-200G turbofans. A total of 32 built.
IAI 1125 Astra SP Version with modified aerodynamics (giving  increase in range), improved avionics and revised interior. A total of 36 built from 1990.
IAI 1125 Astra SPX More powerful ( Honeywell TFE-731-40R-200G) engines and fitted with winglets. Increased weights and range.
Gulfstream G100
marketing name of the IAI 1125 after the programme was taken over by Gulfstream Aerospace in 2001. A total of 77 Astra SPX and G100 aircraft were built.
 Improved version of G100 with wider and longer cabin, a revised nose and uprated engines. Nearly 120 were in service in 2016.

Operators

 Eritrean Air Force one 1125 Astra aircraft operated as presidential transport

 Indian Air Force operates two Gulfstream G100s.

 AIDC operates one Astra SPX aircraft as a target tug

 United States Navy operates two former USAF C-38A Astra SPX 
 VX-20 – Naval Air Station Patuxent River, Maryland

Specifications (G-100)

See also

References

External links

 
 

2000s United States business aircraft
2000s United States military utility aircraft
Twinjets
G100
Aircraft first flown in 1994
Low-wing aircraft
Cruciform tail aircraft